is a Japanese anime director and producer, and a founding member of the animation studio Gainax. He is best known for directing the film Royal Space Force: The Wings of Honnêamise (1987) at age 24, directing Mahoromatic (2001), Magical Shopping Arcade Abenobashi (2002), and an episode of Gurren Lagann (2007). Yamaga also wrote the screenplay for Gundam 0080 (1989). 

He is portrayed by actor Tsuyoshi Muro in the 2014 TV Drama Aoi Honō based on the autobiographical manga by his fellow Osaka University of Arts alumnus Kazuhiko Shimamoto.

Filmography

References

External links 
 
 Yamaga panel at FanimeCon (with pictures)
 https://web.archive.org/web/20070807030003/http://www.fansview.com/2000a/022600e.htm
 

1962 births
Anime directors
Living people
Osaka University of Arts alumni
Gainax